Steppin' Stone is the eighth solo studio album by American country music singer Marie Osmond. It was her fourth studio album issued on Capitol/Curb records. It was released in 1989.

Background
Steppin' Stone consisted of ten tracks. The album was slightly different than her previous releases because it included more traditional-sounding country music instead of the country pop that Osmond had previously recorded. The album contains songs of lost love, love found, love gone wrong, and plans of love to be.
The album was Osmond's least successful album, only peaking at #68 on the Billboard Top Country Albums chart in 1989. Three singles were released that did not chart near the Country Top 40.

The album was produced by Jerry Crutchfield, who did not produce any of Osmond's previous albums (Paul Worley produced her last three) under the Capitol/Curb label.

Track listing
"What Would You Do About You (If You Were Me)" (Michael Garvin, Bucky Jones, Tom Shapiro)  – 3:36
"Slowly But Surely" (Garvin, Jones, Jim Weatherly) –  2:56
"What's in It for Me" (Ron Hellard, Jones, Shapiro)  – 3:15
"Steppin' Stone" (Gary Scruggs, Kevin Welch) –  3:43
"What's a Little Love Between Friends"  (Kent Robbins, Smokey Robinson) 3:59
"If You Think About It, Call Me"  (Garvin, Shapiro)  – 3:41
"Help Me Get Over You"  (Walt Aldridge, Lisa Angelle)  – 3:51
"A Too Blue Moon"  (Charlie Black, Rory Michael Bourke)  – 3:33
"Love Speaks Louder Than Words"  (Taylor Dunn, Paul Overstreet, Kaysie Poulsen, Kellie Poulsen)  – 2:37
"Let Me Be the First" (Deborah Allen, Kix Brooks, Rafe Van Hoy) –  3:38

Personnel
 Jessica Boucher – background vocals
 David Briggs – keyboards
 Clyde Brooks – drums
 Mark Casstevens – acoustic guitar, guitar
 Carol Chase – background vocals
 Jerry Crutchfield – producer
 Steve Fishell – guitar, steel guitar
 Sonny Garish – guitar, steel guitar
 Steve Gibson – acoustic guitar, electric guitar, guitar
 Greg Gordon – background vocals
 Mitch Humphries – keyboards
 Larrie Londin – drums
 Terry McMillan – harmonica, percussion
 Marie Osmond – lead vocals
 Paul Overstreet – background vocals
 Matt Rollings – keyboards
Brent Rowan – electric guitar
 Dennis Wilson – background vocals
 Bob Wray – bass
 Curtis Young – background vocals

Chart performance

Album

Singles

References

1989 albums
Marie Osmond albums
Curb Records albums
Capitol Records albums
Albums produced by Jerry Crutchfield